The Winning Oar is a 1927 American silent drama film directed by Bernard McEveety and starring George Walsh, Dorothy Hall and Arthur Donaldson.

Cast
 George Walsh as Ted Scott 
 Dorothy Hall as Gloria Brooks 
 William Cain as Fred Blake 
 Arthur Donaldson as Robert Brooks 
 Harry Southard as Stanley Wharton 
 Gladys Frazin as Valerie

References

Bibliography
 Munden, Kenneth White. The American Film Institute Catalog of Motion Pictures Produced in the United States, Part 1. University of California Press, 1997.

External links

1927 films
1927 drama films
Silent American drama films
Films directed by Bernard McEveety
American silent feature films
1920s English-language films
American black-and-white films
1920s American films